The Daimler-Mercedes M9456 engine is a supercharged and naturally-aspirated, 6.2-liter to 6.4-liter, straight-6, internal combustion piston engine, designed, developed and produced by Mercedes-Benz, in partnership with Daimler; between 1924 and 1929.

M9456 engine
The six-cylinder in-line 6240 cc engine featured an overhead camshaft which at the time was an unusual feature, with “bevel linkage”. However, it was the switchable supercharger (”Kompressor”), adopted from the company's racing cars, that attracted most of the attention.

The top speed listed was 115 km/h (71 mph) or 120 km/h (75 mph) depending on which of the two offered final drive ratios was fitted.

From 1928 the Modell K received a still more powerful "Kompressor engine", although there was no change to the overall engine size. The official performance figures were unchanged.

Applications
Mercedes 24/100/140 PS

References

Mercedes-Benz engines
Straight-six engines
Engines by model
Gasoline engines by model